The Battle of Llandeilo Fawr was a battle that took place during the conquest of Wales by Edward I, at Llandeilo between an English army led by Gilbert de Clare, 6th Earl of Hertford, and a south Welsh army.

Background 
During the 1282 Welsh war, Edward I had a plan to strike his armies into Wales on three fronts in order to surround the armies of Llywelyn ap Gruffudd and destroy them. Edward sent Gilbert de Clare and his army to subdue and hold down the southern areas of Wales while other armies would invade elsewhere.

The battle 
Gilbert de Clare with an army of around 1600 infantry and 100 cavalrymen had captured Carreg Cennen Castle from the Welsh. Following their victory, the men sacked the castle, and on the 17th of June they headed back to the nearby English settlement, Dinefwr Castle, to stash the spoils. However, along the way Clare and his men were ambushed by Welsh troops and much of the army was destroyed.

Aftermath 
The battle was a great victory for the Welsh. English expansion into south Wales was halted for a few weeks and Edward's plans of an attack on multiple fronts were somewhat spoiled. Among the dead was the son of William de Valence, 1st Earl of Pembroke. Following the defeat, Edward relieved Clare of his command and replaced him with Valence, who was now determined, following the death of his son.

References 

Battles involving Wales
Battles involving England
1282 in Wales
Conflicts in 1282
Edward I of England
Llandeilo